Vijay Ram Raju Satrucharla Zamindar of China Merangi samsthan (Chinamerangi Fort) (born 4 August 1948, in Chinamerangi, Vizianagaram district, Andhra Pradesh) is a MLC of Telugu Desam Party from Andhra Pradesh. He served as member of the Lok Sabha representing Parvathipuram (Lok Sabha constituency). He was elected to 9th, 10th and 12th Lok Sabha. And he also served as forest minister in Andhra Pradesh. He served as the Cabinet Minister of Andhra Pradesh in the YS Raja Sekhar Reddy Cabinet (Congress Government).

References

India MPs 1991–1996
People from Vizianagaram district
1948 births
Living people
Telugu Desam Party politicians
India MPs 1998–1999
India MPs 1989–1991
Lok Sabha members from Andhra Pradesh
Andhra Pradesh MLAs 1978–1983
Andhra Pradesh MLAs 1985–1989
People from Uttarandhra